Arthur Joseph Lopatka (May 28, 1919 – March 10, 2007) was an American professional baseball player, a left-handed pitcher who worked in eight total games in the Major Leagues for the 1945 St. Louis Cardinals and the 1946 Philadelphia Phillies.

Lopatka's professional career began in 1942 in the Cardinals' farm system. A switch-hitter, he also played the outfield in the minors and batted .356 (with 26 hits in 73 at bats) for the 1944 Columbus Red Birds of the top-level American Association.

Lopatka was recalled by the Cardinals in the closing weeks of the 1945 season. In his Major League debut on September 12, he drew the starting assignment against the Brooklyn Dodgers and pitched a complete game, four-hit 3–2 victory at Sportsman's Park, defeating the Dodgers' Ralph Branca. That would represent Lopatka's only Major League victory. He worked in three more games for St. Louis in relief in 1945, then was waived to the Phillies prior to the start of the 1946 campaign. He pitched infrequently and ineffectively for the Phils. In his fourth and final appearance on July 1, 1946, he once again started against the Dodgers, but this time he lasted only one-third of an inning and was charged with three earned runs, taking his second decision and first loss as Brooklyn won 11–6.

In his eight MLB games, Lopatka allowed 20 hits, seven bases on balls, and 12 earned runs in 17 innings pitched.  He left baseball after the 1946 campaign.

References

External links

1919 births
2007 deaths
Baseball players from Chicago
Columbus Red Birds players
Decatur Commodores players
Lynchburg Cardinals players
Major League Baseball pitchers
Philadelphia Phillies players
St. Louis Cardinals players